is a railway station in Katsushika, Tokyo, Japan, operated by Hokusō Railway.

Lines 
Hokusō Railway
Hokusō Line

Layout 
This elevated station consists of two side platforms serving two tracks.

Platforms

Adjacent stations

Surrounding area
 Edogawa River
 Yakiri-no-watashi (Yagiri-no-watashi) Ferry
 Shibamata Taishakuten
 Shibamata Station ( Keisei Kanamachi Line)

References

Railway stations in Tokyo